The Czech Republic is a nation state in Europe.

Czech Republic may also refer to:
Czech Republic (European Parliament constituency)
Czech Socialist Republic, constituent part of Czechoslovakia in 1969–1990, named Czech Republic in 1990–1992

See also
:Category:National sports teams of the Czech Republic for teams colloquially called "Czech Republic"
Czechia (disambiguation)
Czech (disambiguation)
Czechoslovak (disambiguation)